The 1755 Lisbon earthquake, also known as the Great Lisbon earthquake, impacted Portugal, the Iberian Peninsula, and Northwest Africa on the morning of Saturday, 1 November, Feast of All Saints, at around 09:40 local time. In combination with subsequent fires and a tsunami, the earthquake almost completely destroyed Lisbon and adjoining areas.

Chronologically, it was the third known large scale earthquake to hit the city (following those of 1321 and 1531). Estimates place the death toll in Lisbon at between 12,000 and 50,000 people, making it one of the deadliest earthquakes in history.

The earthquake accentuated political tensions in Portugal and profoundly disrupted the Portuguese Empire. The event was widely discussed and dwelt upon by European Enlightenment philosophers, and inspired major developments in theodicy. As the first earthquake studied scientifically for its effects over a large area, it led to the birth of modern seismology and earthquake engineering.

Earthquake and tsunami

The earthquake struck on the morning of 1 November 1755, All Saints' Day. Survivors rushed to the open space of the docks for safety and watched as the sea receded, revealing a plain of mud littered with lost cargo and shipwrecks. Approximately 40 minutes after the earthquake, a tsunami engulfed the harbor and downtown area, rushing up the Tagus river "so fast that several people riding on horseback ... were forced to gallop as fast as possible to the upper grounds for fear of being carried away." It was followed by two more waves.

Lisbon was not the only Portuguese city affected by the catastrophe. Throughout the south of the country, in particular the Algarve, destruction was rampant. The tsunami destroyed some coastal fortresses in the Algarve and, at lower levels, it razed several houses. Almost all the coastal towns and villages of the Algarve were heavily damaged, except Faro, which was protected by the sandy banks of Ria Formosa. In Lagos, the waves reached the top of the city walls. Other towns in different Portuguese regions, such as Peniche, Cascais, Setúbal and even Covilhã (which is located near the Serra da Estrela mountain range in central inland Portugal) were visibly affected by the earthquake, the tsunami or both of them. The shock waves of the earthquake destroyed part of Covilhã's castle walls and its large towers and damaged several other buildings in Cova da Beira, as well as in Salamanca, Spain. In Setúbal, parts of the Fort of São Filipe de Setúbal were damaged.

On the island of Madeira, Funchal and many smaller settlements suffered significant damage. Current and former Portuguese towns in northern Africa were also affected by the earthquake. Places such as Ceuta (ceded by Portugal to Spain in 1668) and Mazagon, where the tsunami hit hard the coastal fortifications of both towns, in some cases going over it, and flooding the harbor area, were affected. In Spain, the tsunamis swept the Andalusian Atlantic Coast, nearly destroying the city of Cadiz.

Shocks from the earthquake were felt throughout Europe as far as Finland and in North Africa, and according to some sources even in Greenland and the Caribbean. Tsunamis as tall as  swept along the coast of North Africa, and struck Martinique and Barbados across the Atlantic Ocean. A  tsunami hit Cornwall on the southern British coast. Galway, on the west coast of Ireland, was also hit, resulting in partial destruction of the "Spanish Arch" section of the city wall. In County Clare, Aughinish Island was created when a low lying connection to the mainland was washed away. At Kinsale, several vessels were whirled round in the harbor, and water poured into the marketplace.

In 2015, it was determined that the tsunami waves may have reached the coast of Brazil, then a colony of Portugal. Letters sent by Brazilian authorities at the time of the earthquake describe damage and destruction caused by gigantic waves.

Although seismologists and geologists have always agreed that the epicenter was in the Atlantic to the west of the Iberian Peninsula, its exact location has been a subject of considerable debate. This structure may have created the primary tectonic event.

Casualties and damage

Economic historian Álvaro Pereira estimated that of Lisbon's population at the time of approximately 200,000 people, 30,000–40,000 were killed. Another 10,000 may have lost their lives in Morocco. A 2009 study of contemporary reports relating to the 1 November event found them vague and difficult to separate from reports of another local series of earthquakes on 18–19 November. Pereira estimated the total death toll in Portugal, Spain and Morocco from the earthquake and the resulting fires and tsunami at 40,000 to 50,000 people.

Eighty-five percent of Lisbon's buildings were destroyed, including famous palaces and libraries, as well as most examples of Portugal's distinctive 16th-century Manueline architecture. Several buildings that had suffered little earthquake damage were destroyed by the subsequent fire. The new Lisbon opera house (the "Ópera do Tejo"), opened seven months before, burned to the ground. The Royal Ribeira Palace, which stood just beside the Tagus river in the modern square of Terreiro do Paço, was destroyed by the earthquake and tsunami. Inside, the 70,000-volume royal library as well as hundreds of works of art, including paintings by Titian, Rubens, and Correggio, were lost. The royal archives disappeared together with detailed historical records of explorations by Vasco da Gama and other early navigators. The palace of Henrique de Meneses, 3rd Marquis of Louriçal, which housed 18,000 books, was also destroyed. The earthquake damaged several major churches in Lisbon, namely the Lisbon Cathedral, the Basilicas of São Paulo, Santa Catarina, São Vicente de Fora, and the Misericórdia Church. The Royal Hospital of All Saints (the largest public hospital at the time) in the Rossio square was consumed by fire and hundreds of patients burned to death. The tomb of national hero Nuno Álvares Pereira was also lost. Visitors to Lisbon may still walk the ruins of the Carmo Convent, which were preserved to remind Lisboners of the destruction. Most of the documentation of the 1722 Algarve earthquake sent to Lisbon for archiving became lost after the fire that followed the 1755 earthquake.

Relief and reconstruction efforts

The royal family escaped unharmed from the catastrophe: King Joseph I of Portugal and the court had left the city, after attending Mass at sunrise, fulfilling the wish of one of the king's daughters to spend the holiday away from Lisbon. After the catastrophe, Joseph I developed a fear of living within walls, and the court was accommodated in a huge complex of tents and pavilions in the hills of Ajuda, then on the outskirts of Lisbon. The king's claustrophobia never waned, and it was only after Joseph's death that his daughter Maria I of Portugal began building the royal Ajuda Palace, which still stands on the site of the old tented camp. Like the king, the prime minister Sebastião de Melo (1st Marquis of Pombal) survived the earthquake. When asked what was to be done, Pombal reportedly replied "bury the dead and heal the living", and set about organizing relief and rehabilitation efforts. Firefighters were sent to extinguish the raging flames, and teams of workers and ordinary citizens were ordered to remove the thousands of corpses before disease could spread. Contrary to custom and against the wishes of the Church, many corpses were loaded onto barges and buried at sea beyond the mouth of the Tagus. To prevent disorder in the ruined city, the Portuguese Army was deployed and gallows were constructed at high points around the city to deter looters; more than thirty people were publicly executed. The army prevented many able-bodied citizens from fleeing, pressing them into relief and reconstruction work.

A project proposed that a new royal palace be built in Campo de Ourique as the new royal residence in 1760, but was later abandoned due to a lack of priority or interest in a palace being built in the Campo de Ourique neighborhood of Lisbon.

The king and the prime minister immediately launched efforts to rebuild the city. On December 4, 1755, a little more than a month after the earthquake, Manuel da Maia, chief engineer to the realm, presented his plans for the re-building of Lisbon. Maia presented four options from abandoning Lisbon to building a completely new city. The first, and cheapest, plan was to rebuild the old city using recycled materials. The second and third plans proposed widening certain streets. The fourth option boldly proposed razing the entire Baixa quarter and "laying out new streets without restraint". This last option was chosen by the king and his minister.

In less than a year, the city was cleared of debris. Keen to have a new and perfectly ordered city, the king commissioned the construction of big squares, rectilinear, large avenues and widened streetsthe new mottos of Lisbon.

The Pombaline buildings are among the earliest seismically protected constructions in Europe. Small wooden models were built for testing, and earthquakes were simulated by marching troops around them. Lisbon's "new" Lower Town, known today as the Pombaline Lower Town (Baixa Pombalina), is one of the city's famed attractions. Sections of other Portuguese cities, such as the Vila Real de Santo António in Algarve, were also rebuilt along Pombaline principles.

The Casa Pia, a Portuguese institution founded by Maria I (known as A Pia, "Maria the Pious"), and organized by Police Intendant Pina Manique in 1780, was founded following the social disarray of the 1755 Lisbon earthquake.

Effect on society, economy, and philosophy

The earthquake had wide-ranging effects on the lives of the populace and intelligentsia. The earthquake had struck on an important religious holiday and had destroyed almost every important church in the city, causing anxiety and confusion amongst the citizens of a staunch and devout Roman Catholic country. Theologians and philosophers focused and speculated on the religious cause and message, seeing the earthquake as a manifestation of divine judgment.

Economy 
A 2009 study estimated that the earthquake cost between 32 and 48 percent of Portugal's GDP. Also, "in spite of strict controls, prices and wages remained volatile in the years after the tragedy. The recovery from the earthquake also led to a rise in the wage premium of construction workers. More significantly, the earthquake became an opportunity to reform the economy and to reduce the economic semi-dependency vis-à-vis Britain."

Philosophy 

The earthquake and its aftermath strongly influenced the intelligentsia of the European Age of Enlightenment. The noted writer-philosopher Voltaire used the earthquake in Candide and in his Poème sur le désastre de Lisbonne ("Poem on the Lisbon disaster"). Voltaire's Candide attacks the notion that all is for the best in this, "the best of all possible worlds", a world closely supervised by a benevolent deity.  The Lisbon disaster provided a counterexample for Voltaire. Theodor Adorno wrote, "[t]he earthquake of Lisbon sufficed to cure Voltaire of the theodicy of Leibniz" (Negative Dialectics 361).  Jean-Jacques Rousseau was also influenced by the devastation following the earthquake, whose severity he believed was due to too many people living within the close quarters of the city. Rousseau used the earthquake as an argument against cities as part of his desire for a more naturalistic way of life.

Immanuel Kant published three separate texts in 1756 on the Lisbon earthquake. As a younger man, fascinated with the earthquake, he collected all the information available in news pamphlets and formulated a theory of the causes of earthquakes. Kant's theory, which involved shifts in huge caverns filled with hot gases, though inaccurate, was one of the first systematic attempts to explain earthquakes in natural rather than supernatural terms. According to Walter Benjamin, Kant's slim early book on the earthquake "probably represents the beginnings of scientific geography in Germany. And certainly the beginnings of seismology".

Werner Hamacher has claimed that the earthquake's consequences extended into the vocabulary of philosophy, making the common metaphor of firm "grounding" for philosophers' arguments shaky and uncertain: "Under the impression exerted by the Lisbon earthquake, which touched the European mind in one [of] its more sensitive epochs, the metaphor of ground and tremor completely lost their apparent innocence; they were no longer merely figures of speech" (263).  Hamacher claims that the foundational certainty of René Descartes' philosophy began to shake following the Lisbon earthquake.

Politics 

The earthquake had a major impact on politics. The prime minister, Sebastião José de Carvalho e Melo, 1st Marquis of Pombal, was the favorite of the king, but the aristocracy despised him as an upstart son of a country squire. The prime minister, in turn, disliked the old nobles, whom he considered corrupt and incapable of practical action. Before 1 November 1755 there was a constant struggle for power and royal favour, but the competent response of the Marquis of Pombal effectively severed the power of the old aristocratic factions. However, silent opposition and resentment of King Joseph I began to rise, which would culminate with the attempted assassination of the king in 1758 and the subsequent elimination of the powerful Duke of Aveiro and the Távora family.

Development of seismology

The prime minister's response was not limited to the practicalities of reconstruction. He ordered a query sent to all parishes of the country regarding the earthquake and its effects. Questions included:
 At what time did the earthquake begin, and how long did the earthquake last?
 Did you perceive the shock to be greater from one direction than another? Example, from north to south? Did buildings seem to fall more to one side than the other?
 How many people died and were any of them distinguished?
 Did the sea rise or fall first, and how many hands did it rise above the normal?
 If fire broke out, how long did it last and what damage did it cause?

The answers to these and other questions are still archived in the Torre do Tombo, the national historical archive. Studying and cross-referencing the priests' accounts, modern scientists were able to reconstruct the event from a scientific perspective. Without the questionnaire designed by the Marquis of Pombal, this would have been impossible. Because the marquis was the first to attempt an objective scientific description of the broad causes and consequences of an earthquake, he is regarded as a forerunner of modern seismological scientists.

In popular culture
The 18th century English Baroque composer Richard Carter composed and published an ode on the earthquake.

A fictionalized version of the 1755 Lisbon earthquake features as a main plot element of the 2014 video game Assassin's Creed Rogue, developed and published by Ubisoft. Notably, a similar earthquake occurs earlier in the story in Port-au-Prince, Haiti, and possibly coincides with a real-world earthquake recorded there in 1751.

The album 1755 by the Portuguese Gothic Metal band Moonspell is a concept album detailing the story of the 1755 Lisbon earthquake. The album is entirely sung in Portuguese and explores not only the history but also its effects on Portuguese society, culture and spirituality.

The Lisbon earthquake is vividly depicted in Avram Davidson's Masters of the Maze - one of the many times and places visited by the book's time-traveling protagonists.  

The board game, Lisboa, created in 2017 by Vital Lacerda, focuses on the reconstruction of Lisbon after the earthquake.

See also
 
 1722 Algarve earthquake
 1755 Cape Ann earthquake
 1761 Portugal earthquake
 Azores–Gibraltar Transform Fault
 Earthquake Baroque
 List of earthquakes in Portugal
 List of historical earthquakes
 List of megathrust earthquakes
 List of historical tsunamis
 Southwest Iberian Margin

Notes

References

 Benjamin, Walter. "The Lisbon Earthquake." In Selected Writings vol. 2. Belknap, 1999. .  The often abstruse critic Benjamin gave a series of radio broadcasts for children in the early 1930s; this one, from 1931, discusses the Lisbon earthquake and summarizes some of its impact on European thought.
 Braun, Theodore E. D., and John B. Radner, eds. The Lisbon Earthquake of 1755: Representations and Reactions (SVEC 2005:02).  Oxford: Voltaire Foundation, 2005.  .  Recent scholarly essays on the earthquake and its representations in art, with a focus on Voltaire.  (In English and French.)
 Brooks, Charles B. Disaster at Lisbon: The Great Earthquake of 1755. Long Beach: Shangton Longley Press, 1994.  (No apparent ISBN.) A narrative history.
 Chase, J. "The Great Earthquake at Lisbon (1755)". Colliers Magazine, 1920.
 Dynes, Russell Rowe. "The dialogue between Voltaire and Rousseau on the Lisbon earthquake: The emergence of a social science view." University of Delaware, Disaster Research Center, 1999.
 Fonseca, J. D. 1755, O Terramoto de Lisboa, The Lisbon Earthquake. Argumentum, Lisbon, 2004.
 Gunn, A.M. "Encyclopedia of Disasters". Westport, Connecticut: Greenwood Publishing Group, 2008. .
 Hamacher, Werner. "The Quaking of Presentation." In Premises: Essays on Philosophy and Literature from Kant to Celan, pp. 261–293. Stanford University Press, 1999. .
 Kendrick, T.D. The Lisbon Earthquake. Philadelphia and New York: J. B. Lippincott, 1957.
 Molesky, Mark.  This Gulf of Fire: The Destruction of Lisbon, or Apocalypse in the Age of Science and Reason.  New York: Knopf, 2015.
 Neiman, Susan. Evil in Modern Thought: An Alternative History of Modern Philosophy. Princeton University Press, 2002.  This book centers on philosophical reaction to the earthquake, arguing that the earthquake was responsible for modern conceptions of evil.
 Paice, Edward. Wrath of God: The Great Lisbon Earthquake of 1755. London: Quercus, 2008. 
 Pereira, A.S. "The Opportunity of a Disaster: The Economic Impact of the 1755 Lisbon Earthquake". Discussion Paper 06/03, Centre for Historical Economics and Related Research at York, York University, 2006.
 Quenet, Grégory. Les tremblements de terre en France aux XVIIe et XVIIIe siècles. La naissance d'un risque. Seyssel: Champ Vallon, 2005.
 Ray, Gene. "Reading the Lisbon Earthquake: Adorno, Lyotard, and the Contemporary Sublime." Yale Journal of Criticism 17.1 (2004): pp. 1–18.
 Seco e Pinto, P.S. (Editor). Earthquake Geotechnical Engineering: Proceedings of the Second International Conference, Lisbon, Portugal, 21–25 June 1999. 
 Shrady, Nicholas. The Last Day: Wrath, Ruin & Reason in The Great Lisbon Earthquake of 1755, Penguin, 2008, 
 Weinrich, Harald. "Literaturgeschichte eines Weltereignisses: Das Erdbeben von Lissabon." In Literatur für Leser, pp. 64–76. Stuttgart: Kohlhammer Verlag, 1971. .  In German. Cited by Hamacher as a broad survey of philosophical and literary reactions to the Lisbon earthquake.

Further reading

Martínez-Loriente, S., Sallarès, V. & Gràcia, E. The Horseshoe Abyssal plain Thrust could be the source of the 1755 Lisbon earthquake and tsunami. Commun Earth Environ 2, 145 (2021). https://doi.org/10.1038/s43247-021-00216-5
 Wilke, Jürgen, The Lisbon Earthquake (1755), EGO – European History Online, Mainz: Institute of European History, 2017, retrieved: March 17, 2021 (pdf).

External links

 The Lisbon earthquake of 1755: the catastrophe and its European repercussions.
 The 1755 Lisbon Earthquake, available seismological studies from the European Archive of Historical Earthquake Data
 The 1755 Lisbon Earthquake
 Images and historical depictions of the 1755 Lisbon earthquake
 More images of the 1755 Lisbon earthquake and tsunami
 Contemporary eyewitness account of Rev. Charles Davy
 Tsunami Forecast Model Animation: Lisbon 1755 – Pacific Tsunami Warning Center

Earthquakes in Portugal
1755 Earthquake
Lisbon Earthquake, 1755
Lisbon earthquake, 1755
Lisbon
Earthquakes in Spain
Earthquakes in Morocco
18th century in Morocco